= Athwal =

Coordinates: 31.692°N 75.339°E

- Village
- Interactive map of Athwal
- Country: India
- State: Punjab
- District: Gurdaspur
- Tehsil: Batala
- Region: Majha

Government
  - Type: Panchayat raj
  - Body: Gram panchayat

Area
  - Total: 285 ha (700 acres)

Population (2011)
  - Total: 1,147; 604/543 ♂/♀
  - Scheduled Castes: 41; 22/19 ♂/♀
  - Total Households: 214

Languages
  - Official: Punjabi
- Time zone: UTC+5:30 (IST)
- Postal code: 143514
- Telephone: 01872
- ISO 3166 code: IN-PB
- Vehicle registration: PB18
- Website: gurdaspur.nic.in

Athwal is a village in batala in Gurdaspur district of Punjab State, India. It is located 35 kilometres (22 mi) from sub district headquarter and 40 kilometres (25 mi) from district headquarter. The village is administrated by a Sarpanch, an elected representative of the village.

== Demography ==
As of 2011, the village has a total number of 214 houses and a population of 1147 of which 604 are males while 543 are females. According to the report published by Census India in 2011, out of the total population of the village 41 people are from Schedule Caste and the village does not have any Schedule Tribe population so far.

== See also ==
- List of villages in India
